Daniel de la Vega may refer to:

 Daniel de la Vega (1892–1971), Chilean poet and playwright
 Daniel de la Vega (film director) (born 1972), Argentine film director, directed Jennifer's Shadow and acted in Plaga Zombie: Zona Mutante
 Daniel de la Vega (animator), American animator/director, worked on Belle's Magical World, Fangface, et al.